Mohamed Iqbal bin Hamid Hussain (born 6 June 1993) is a Singaporean professional footballer who plays as a forward for the Singapore Premier League side Geylang International FC.

Club career

Gombak United
Iqbal started his career at Gombak United where he scored 2 goals in 7 league games.

LionsXII
He joined Malaysia Super League club LionsXII after Gombak United withdrew from the S.League at the end of the 2012 season.

Young Lions
Restricted to one league appearance in the 2013 season and in need for match experience leading to the Southeast Asian Games, he was de-registered in April 2013 and joined under-23 developmental side Courts Young Lions in the S.League. He scored a total of 8 goals in 44 games during his 3 years stint with the club.

Hougang United
In 2016, he joined Hougang United FC.
Although he did not have much playing time
due to his National Service, Iqbal worked hard and impressed when he got to play and he even got a recall to the national team in 2016. In total, he finished the season with 6 goals, 8 assists in 24 games across all competitions. He even earned an S.League Goal of the Year nomination. His performances led to a contraction extension into the 2017 S.League season. However, due to his NS commitments, Iqbal was hardly able to make himself available for the Cheetahs, missing huge chunks of the season. After serving his NS in August 2017, Iqbal started featuring more prominently for the club. His efforts paid off as he was offered a contract extension for the 2018 S.League season.

Sukhothai F.C.
He went for trials in Thailand where he was offered a contract with Thai League 1 side Sukhothai. However, the deal collapsed at the last minute.

Geylang International
He signed for the Eagles for the 2020 season and scored twice in his 2nd appearance for the team.

Chennai City 
Iqbal became the first Singaporean to play in the I-League when he signed for Chennai City FC in December 2020. In the final game of the season, Iqbal scored the winner in the 94th minute to help his team finish 2-1 winners over already relegated NEROCA F.C. for his 3rd goal in 3 games. He scored 3 goals and made 2 assists in 10 games to help his team starve off relegation.

Balestier Khalsa 
After a great stint with the I-League side Chennai City FC in India, Iqbal returned to his home country and signed for the Singapore Premier League side Balestier Khalsa for the remainder of the 2021 season. He made his first start for the Tigers in a 3-2 loss to developmental side Young Lions.

International career
Iqbal Hussain was part of the Singapore national under-23 team that won the bronze medal at the 2013 Southeast Asian Games.

Iqbal Hussain was called up to the senior team in July 2013.

Iqbal represented Singapore U23 at the 2014 Asian Games.

He made his senior international debut in the 35th minute of a friendly match against Papua New Guinea on 6 September 2014.

He earned the last of his seven Lions caps in 2019.

Career statistics

Club

. Caps and goals may not be correct.

 Young Lions and LionsXII are ineligible for qualification to AFC competitions in their respective leagues.

International statistics

U19 International caps

U23 International goals

Honours
LionsXII
Malaysia Super League: 2013

Singapore
Southeast Asian Games bronze medal: 2013

References 

1993 births
Living people
Singaporean footballers
Singapore international footballers
Association football forwards
Gombak United FC players
LionsXII players
Singapore Premier League players
Malaysia Super League players
Young Lions FC players
Footballers at the 2014 Asian Games
Singaporean people of Malay descent
Southeast Asian Games bronze medalists for Singapore
Southeast Asian Games medalists in football
Competitors at the 2013 Southeast Asian Games
Asian Games competitors for Singapore